The Cymru Leagues is an umbrella name for the top two tiers of the Welsh football league system. It consists of the Cymru Premier at Tier 1, as well as the Cymru North and Cymru South at the second tier.

Tier 1 
The Cymru Premier is the national football league of Wales. It has both professional and semi-professional status clubs and is at the top of the Welsh football league system. Prior to 2002, the league was known as the League of Wales (LoW), but changed its name as part of a sponsorship deal to the Welsh Premier League.  The league has been rebranded as the Cymru Premier for the 2019–20 season.

Tier 2 
The Cymru North and Cymru South are two football leagues in Wales that forms the second level of the Welsh football league system. They have semi-professional status clubs. The first year of their operation is 2019-20 with the Football Association of Wales owning and administering the Tier 2 leagues for the first time. These changes follow from a review of the Welsh Football Pyramid, where the Tier 2 was called the FAW Championship

The tier is split regionally, with the Cymru North covering clubs playing in northern Wales, and the Cymru South covering clubs playing in southern Wales. The winners of each division are eligible for promotion to the Cymru Premier, subject to the clubs meeting FAW criteria for Tier 1 grounds, playing facilities and financial operations.

Relegation from the Cymru North is to three regional based Tier 3 leagues - the Welsh National League (Wrexham Area), the Welsh Alliance League and the Mid Wales Football League. The Cymru South has relegation to the Tier 3 Welsh Football League Division One.

52 teams applied for Tier 2 certification with teams assessed against a number of infrastructure criteria including; safety policy and evacuation plan, covered seating, pitch dimensions, dressing room & sanitary facilities required to be granted Tier 2 certification. Following on from the meeting of the FAW's first decision body, 43 clubs were successful in gaining Tier 2 certification.

Member clubs for 2022–23 season

The clubs for the second season are as follows:

Cymru Premier

The Cymru Premier is a twelve-club league.
Aberystwyth Town
Airbus UK Broughton
Bala Town
Caernarfon Town
Cardiff Metropolitan University
Connah's Quay Nomads
Flint Town
Haverfordwest County
Newtown
Pen-y-Bont
Pontypridd Town
The New Saints

Cymru North

The Cymru North is a sixteen-club league. 

Buckley Town
Cefn Druids
Chirk AAA
Colwyn Bay
Conwy Borough
Gresford Athletic
Guilsfield
Holyhead Hotspur
Holywell Town
Llandudno
Llanidloes Town
Penrhyncoch
Mold Alexandra
Porthmadog
Prestatyn Town
Ruthin

Cymru South

The Cymru South is a sixteen-club league.

Afan Lido
Ammanford
Abergavenny Town
Barry Town United
Briton Ferry Llansawel
Cambrian & Clydach Vale
Carmarthen Town
Cwmbran Celtic
Goytre United
Llanelli Town
Llantwit Major
Pontardawe Town
Swansea University
Taffs Well 
Trefelin BGC
Ynyshir Albions

Relegation
Teams relegated from the Cymru North and the Cymru South at the end of the 2019–20 season dropped to the newly established Ardal Leagues which operated for the first time in the 2021–22 season.

The bottom three teams from each of the tier 2 leagues will be relegated.

See also
List of association football competitions
Welsh Football League
Cymru Alliance

References

External links
Official site of the JD Cymru Leagues

Sports leagues established in 2019
2019 establishments in Wales
Football leagues in Wales
Professional sports leagues in the United Kingdom